The Funeral Album is the eighth and final album by the Finnish metal band Sentenced. It was released on 31 May 2005.

Track listing

Personnel 
 Ville Laihiala – vocals
 Miika Tenkula – lead guitar
 Sami Lopakka – rhythm guitar
 Sami Kukkohovi – bass
 Vesa Ranta – drums

2005 albums
Sentenced albums
Century Media Records albums